Razole Assembly constituency is an SC reserved constituency in Konaseema district of Andhra Pradesh, representing the state legislative assembly in India. It is one of the seven assembly segments of Amalapuram Lok Sabha constituency, along with Ramachandrapuram, Mummidivaram, Amalapuram (SC), Gannavaram, Kothapeta, and Mandapeta. Rapaka Varaprasada Rao is the present MLA of the constituency, who won the 2019 Andhra Pradesh Legislative Assembly election from Jana Sena Party. , there are a total of 186,819 electors in the constituency.

Mandals 

The four mandals that form the assembly constituency are:

The villages of Mamidikuduru Mandal that are covered by the constituency are Mamidikuduru, Geddada, Edarada, Komarada, Magatapalle and Gogannamatham. The other part of this mandal is a part of Gannavaram Assembly constituency.

Members of Legislative Assembly Pallipalem

Members of Legislative Assembly Razole

Election results

Assembly elections 1952

Assembly Elections 2004

Assembly Elections 2009

Assembly elections 2014

Assembly elections 2019

See also 
 List of constituencies of the Andhra Pradesh Legislative Assembly

References 

Assembly constituencies of Andhra Pradesh